Xylota ferratus is a species of hoverfly in the family Syrphidae.

Distribution
Myanmar.

References

Eristalinae
Insects described in 1985
Diptera of Asia